Luc Lang (born 1956 in Suresnes) is a French writer, born in a working-class family.

Biography  
Lang attended literary preparatory classes: Upper Letters (Hypokhâgne) at the lycée Honoré-de-Balzac, then in Upper First (khâgne) at the lycée Jules Ferry and he showed a passion for work, theory, considered from a lyrical point of view.

He teaches esthetics at the École nationale supérieure d'arts de Paris-Cergy.

He was awarded the Prix Jean-Freustié in 1988 and the Prix Charles Oulmont in 1989 for Voyage sur la ligne d'horizon, as well as the Prix Goncourt des lycéens in 1998 for Mille six cents ventres.

Works 
1988: Voyage sur la ligne d’horizon, novel, Éditions Gallimard,  
Prix Jean-Freustié 1988., Prix Charles Oulmont 1989
1991: Liverpool marée haute, Gallimard,  
1995: Furies, novel, Gallimard,  
1998: Mille six cents ventres, novel, Fayard,  
Prix Goncourt des lycéens 1998.
1999: Emmanuel Saulnier : principe transparent, essay in collaboration with Jean-Pierre Greff - Regard
2001: Les Indiens, novel, Stock,  
2002: Les Invisibles : 12 récits sur l'art contemporain, essay.- Regard, 2002
2003: 11 septembre Mon Amour, essay, Stock
2003: Notes pour une poétique du roman, essay, Amis d'inventaire-invention, series "Textes"
2006: La Fin des paysages, novel, Stock,  
2008: Cruels, 13, novel, Stock,  
2010: Esprit chien, novel, Stock,  
2011: Délit de fiction : la littérature, pourquoi ?, essay, Gallimard
2012: Mother, novel, Stock,  
2014: L’Autoroute, novel, Stock,   
2016: Au commencement du septième jour, novel, Stock, 
2019: La Tentation, novel, Stock

References

External links 

 Luc Lang on Babelio
 Luc Lang prend le virage de la vie on L'Express (27 September 2016)
 Luc Lang regarde l’abîme on Le Monde (25 August 2016)
 Au commencement du septième jour by Luc Lang on France Inter (20 September 2016)
 Luc Lang à tombeau ouvert on Libération (7 Octobre 2016)
 Le roman monde de Luc Lang on Le Point (16 October 2016)
 Luc Lang - Au commencement du septième jour on YouTube 
 Luc Lang on France Culture

20th-century French essayists
21st-century French essayists
20th-century French novelists
21st-century French novelists
Prix Goncourt des lycéens winners
Prix Jean Freustié winners
1956 births
People from Suresnes
Living people
Prix Médicis winners